Perine is a surname. Notable people with the name include: 

 Edward Martineau Perine (1809–1905), American merchant and planter 
 George Edward Perine (1837–1885), American artist, engraver, and publisher 
 Kelly Perine (born 1969), American television actor
 La'Mical Perine (born 1998), American football player
 Samaje Perine (born 1995), American football player

See also 
 Perrine (disambiguation)
 Perin (disambiguation)
 Billiou-Stillwell-Perine House, the oldest extant house on Staten Island, New York